The Royal Monastery of Santa Maria de Oia is a former Cistercian monastery, founded in 1137. It is located in the province of Pontevedra, in the autonomous community of Galicia, Spain. It was declared a Bien de Interés Cultural landmark in 1931. The monastery is listed in the Register of Assets of Cultural Interest of Galicia in the list corresponding to the Province of Pontevedra, in the municipality of Oia, Spain.

It lies on the Portuguese Way route of the Camino pilgrim path to Santiago de Compostela.

See also
 List of Jesuit sites

References

Bibliography 
Manso Porto, Carmen (2002). El monasterio de Santa María la Real de Oia. Estudio histórico-artístico. Cuadernos de estudios gallegos 49 (115): 251–306. ISSN 0210-847X. (in Spanish)
Pereira Morales, Ana María (2003). El Monasterio de Santa María de Oia: intervenciones arquitectónicas del siglo XVIII. Quintana: revista de estudios do Departamento de Historia da Arte (2): 211–225. ISSN 1579-7414. (in Spanish)
Avelino Baquero Alonso: Breve historia del Monasterio y Parroquia de Santa María de Oia. FAMA, Curuxo - Vigo, o.J.,  (in Spanish)
Henrik Karge: "Gotische Architektur in Kastilien und León". in: Spanische Kunstgeschichte – eine Einführung, hrsg. von Sylvaine Hensel und Henrik Karge, Bd. 1, Dietrich Reimer Verlag, Berlin 1992,  (in German)

External links

Christian monasteries in Spain
Church ruins in Spain
Bien de Interés Cultural landmarks in the Province of Pontevedra
Christian monasteries established in the 12th century
Monasteries in Galicia (Spain)
Francoist concentration camps